Tempelhof Airways USA was a regional airline headquartered in Fort Lauderdale, United States, based out of Berlin Tempelhof Airport in West Berlin during the time when it was under the jurisdiction of the western nations. It operated German domestic services from 1981 until the reunification of Germany in 1990.

History

Tempelhof Airways USA (not to be confused with Tempelhof Express) was founded in Fort Lauderdale, FL, in 1981 by Knut Kramer, a Berliner living in both Florida and Berlin. In April 1982, it began Air Taxi operations with a Piper Navajo from West Berlin's Tempelhof airport.  At that time, West Berlin could, due to its status as an occupied city, only have operations by airlines of the United States, France and Great Britain.

In January 1985, scheduled flight operations began between Berlin and Paderborn using Nord 262 aircraft. Most of these flights were for the massive Nixdorf Computer offices based there. Operations were later expanded to Dortmund, Luxembourg, Augsburg and Braunschweig.  In 1988, the Saab 340 was put into service for the Berlin-Hamburg route. They also operated an ambulance/medivac aircraft for many years, doing patient transport as well as organ transplant. They used a Lear 25 at first then expanded to a Lear 35. This was undertaken for the DeutscheRettungsflugwacht (German Air Rescue) organization in Stuttgart. After the Berlin Wall fell, German pilots were allowed to fly to and from Berlin and the operation was absorbed into the parent company. Several of the old TAUSA medivac pilots were hired to remain with the operation.

Following the reunification of Germany, Tempelhof Airways found itself unable to compete with other German carriers and, at the end of October 1990, all flights ceased.

Fleet

Piper Navajo
Cessna 441
Learjet 25 
Learjet 35
Nord 262A
Saab 340A

See also 
 List of defunct airlines of Germany
 List of defunct airlines of the United States

References
Citations

Bibliography

External links

Defunct airlines of Germany
Airlines established in 1981
Airlines disestablished in 1991
1981 establishments in West Germany
German companies disestablished in 1991
German companies established in 1981